Antiguraleus infandus is a species of sea snail, a marine gastropod mollusk in the family Mangeliidae.

Description
The length of the shell attains 6 mm, its diameter 3 mm.

(Original description) The shell is white and chalky. It contains 5 rounded whorls, including a smooth protoconch of about 1½ whorl. The shell is  longitudinally vertically ribbed, the ribs strong right up to the
suture and persisting faintly down the base. The body whorl shows about nine ribs. Strong spirals cross the ribs, two on the second whorl, three above the aperture, a fourth and faint fifth on the body-whorl. The sutures of the early whorls are sharp. of those succeeding concavely rounded. The base is spirally striated. The type is worn—the protoconch damaged, and the outer lip broken away for a quarter of a whorl. There are spiral striations between the main spirals, and these are strongest on the somewhat hollow infrasutural tabulation. There is no anal fasciole.

Distribution
This marine species occurs off Great Barrier Island, New Zealand.

References

 Powell, A.W.B. 1979: New Zealand Mollusca: Marine, Land and Freshwater Shells, Collins, Auckland (p. 239)
 Spencer, H.G., Marshall, B.A. & Willan, R.C. (2009). Checklist of New Zealand living Mollusca. Pp 196–219. in: Gordon, D.P. (ed.) New Zealand inventory of biodiversity. Volume one. Kingdom Animalia: Radiata, Lophotrochozoa, Deuterostomia. Canterbury University Press, Christchurch.

External links
  Tucker, J.K. 2004 Catalog of recent and fossil turrids (Mollusca: Gastropoda). Zootaxa 682:1–1295.
 New Zealand Mollusca: Propebela infanda
 Biolib.cz: Image of Antiguraleus infandus

infandus
Gastropods described in 1906
Gastropods of New Zealand